The 2005 No Mercy was the eighth No Mercy professional wrestling pay-per-view (PPV) event produced by World Wrestling Entertainment (WWE). It was held exclusively for wrestlers from the promotion's SmackDown! brand division. The event took place on October 9, 2005, at the Toyota Center in Houston, Texas. Nine professional wrestling matches were scheduled on the event's card.

Three of the four championships exclusive to the SmackDown! brand were contested for; one was lost while the other two were retained. The main event was a standard wrestling match, in which World Heavyweight Champion Batista defeated challenger Eddie Guerrero to retain his title. This would be Guerrero's final pay-per-view match before his sudden death one month later. One of the featured preliminary matches was a Casket match between The Ortons (Randy and "Cowboy" Bob) and The Undertaker. The Ortons won the match after placing Undertaker inside the casket and closing it. Another primary preliminary match was a standard match between John "Bradshaw" Layfield (JBL) and Rey Mysterio, which JBL won.

The event received 219,000 pay-per-view buys, which was greater than the 193,000 buys the previous year's event received. The event was claimed to be "unmerciful" by Canadian Online Explorer's professional wrestling section, as they rated none of the matches higher than a five out of ten. When the event was released on DVD, it reached a peak position of fourth on Billboard'''s DVD sales chart for recreational sports. It remained on the chart for four consecutive weeks.

Production
Background
No Mercy was first held by World Wrestling Entertainment (WWE) as a United Kingdom-exclusive pay-per-view (PPV) in May 1999. A second No Mercy was then held later that same year in October, but in the United States, which established No Mercy as the annual October PPV for the promotion. The 2005 event was the eighth event under the No Mercy chronology and was held on October 9 at the Toyota Center in Houston, Texas. Like the previous two years, it featured wrestlers exclusively from the SmackDown! brand.

Storylines
Nine professional wrestling matches were featured on the event's card, which were planned with predetermined outcomes by WWE's script writers. The buildup to these matches and scenarios that took place before, during and after the event were also planned by the script writers. The event featured wrestlers and other talent from WWE's SmackDown! brand, a storyline expansion in which WWE assigned its employees. Wrestlers portrayed either a villainous or fan favorite gimmick, an on-screen character, for the entertainment of the audience.

The main rivalry heading into No Mercy was between Batista and Eddie Guerrero over the World Heavyweight Championship. On the September 16 episode of SmackDown!, Palmer Cannon, a miscellaneous on-screen authority figure of SmackDown!, a portrayed match maker and rules enforcer, announced that Guerrero was the next challenger to Batista's World Heavyweight Championship. Guerrero, who had recently portrayed a manipulative character, came out and claimed he was now more about compassion than manipulation. Two weeks later, on the September 30 episode of SmackDown!, Guerrero, as part of the scripted events, accidentally hit Batista with a folding chair while attempting to hit MNM tag team member Joey Mercury. The following week, Batista showed Guerrero the footage of him hitting Batista last week. Batista, as part of their storyline, then proclaimed that he would hurt Guerrero if he were to revert to his villainous character.

The feud between The Undertaker and Randy Orton and "Cowboy" Bob Orton began at SummerSlam. At the event, Randy faced off against Undertaker. During the match, "Cowboy" Bob (disguised as a fan) came into the ring and interrupted the match. Following this, Randy pinned Undertaker after he jumped and pulled Undertaker's head down over his shoulders, a move dubbed the RKO, to win. After the match, Randy peeled off the latex mask of the fan and revealed him to be his father, "Cowboy" Bob. On the September 16 episode of SmackDown!, Undertaker defeated Randy. During the match, "Cowboy" Bob drove a U-Haul truck down to the ring and unloaded a casket. As Undertaker went to put Randy inside the casket, he opened it and found a mannequin of himself inside. Despite this distraction, Undertaker pinned Randy after he hit him with the Tombstone Piledriver. The following week, druids wheeled out a casket. Undertaker appeared on the TitanTron and urged The Ortons to look inside. The Ortons opened the casket and found mannequins of themselves inside. Undertaker then proclaimed that this would be their fate at No Mercy.

At the previous SmackDown! brand pay-per-view event, The Great American Bash, The Legion of Doom (Road Warrior Animal and Heidenreich) defeated MNM (Joey Mercury and Johnny Nitro) to win the WWE Tag Team Championship. After both teams got involved in a storyline between Melina (Melina Perez), who was also a member of MNM, and Christy Hemme, The Legion of Doom and Hemme versus MNM was announced for No Mercy.

The storyline over the WWE United States Championship began when Booker T, Orlando Jordan, and Christian each explained why they thought they deserved a title match against the champion, Chris Benoit. Theodore Long, SmackDown!'s on-screen general manager/authority figure, then announced that Benoit could choose who he wanted to face for the title. After Jordan won a Triple Threat match, also involving Booker and Christian, Benoit decided that he would face all three men in a Fatal 4-Way match between the four at No Mercy.

Event
Before the live broadcast of the event began, William Regal and Paul Burchill defeated Paul London and Brian Kendrick in a tag team match that aired on the Sunday Night Heat pre-show.

Preliminary matches

The first match of the event was The Legion of Doom (Animal and Heidenreich) and Christy Hemme and MNM (Joey Mercury, Johnny Nitro, and Melina) in a six-person tag team match. After a match predominately controlled by MNM, Hemme pinned Melina after executing a Doomsday Device to win the match for her team.

In the next match Bobby Lashley, who made his WWE pay-per-view debut, faced Simon Dean. Lashley won the match in under two minutes after pinning Dean after a Dominator. Lashley forced Dean to eat 20 double cheeseburgers as the show progressed.

The third contest was a fatal 4-way in which Chris Benoit defended the United States Championship against Booker T, Christian, and Orlando Jordan. After a match evenly controlled by all four men, Benoit forced Christian to submit with the sharpshooter submission hold to win the match and retain the title.

In the next match Mr. Kennedy faced Hardcore Holly. Kennedy controlled most of the match, as he attacked and applied various submission holds on Holly's arm. Kennedy pinned Holly after he performed a Green Bay Plunge off the top rope.

In the next match, John "Bradshaw" Layfield (JBL) faced Rey Mysterio. The match went back and forth, as each man gained the advantage many times. JBL pinned Mysterio after a Clothesline from Hell to win.

Main event matches
The sixth bout on the card was a Casket match between The Ortons (Randy and "Cowboy" Bob) and The Undertaker. In order for The Undertaker to win the match, he had to put both Randy and "Cowboy" Bob in the casket, which was at ringside, and close it; for The Ortons, they had to place Undertaker in the casket and close it. Near the end of the match, Undertaker had placed "Cowboy" Bob in the casket and was attempting to place Randy in it as well. After performing a Last Ride on Randy, Undertaker went to open the casket. As he did, however, "Cowboy" Bob sprayed a fire extinguisher in his eyes. Randy then hit Undertaker with a folding chair and placed him in the casket. The Ortons closed the casket to win the bout. After the match, The Ortons, as part of the scripted events, locked Undertaker in the casket and hit it numerous times with an axe. They then poured gasoline on the casket and lit it on fire (just like Kane did  at the 1998 Royal Rumble).

The next match saw WWE Cruiserweight Champion Nunzio defend his title against Juventud. After a back and forth match between the two, Juventud pinned Nunzio after a sit-out scoop slam piledriver to win the match and the Cruiserweight Championship.

Next was the main event, which saw Batista defend the World Heavyweight Championship against Eddie Guerrero. Towards the end of the match, Guerrero executed three vertical suplexes, and attempted to perform a Frog Splash. Batista, however, rolled out of the way and performed a Spinebuster. Batista pinned Guerrero afterwards to win the match and retain the World Heavyweight Championship. After the match, Batista and the crowd at the arena sang "Happy Birthday" to Guerrero.

Reception
The event received 219,000 pay-per-view buys, which was greater than the 193,000 buys the previous year's event received. The promotion's revenue was $18.8 million, which was greater than the previous year's revenue of $18.5 million. Canadian Online Explorer's professional wrestling section claimed the event was "unmerciful" and that it left fans "begging for mercy". They rated the overall event, as well as the main event, a five out of ten. None of the matches received a rating higher than a five out of 10. The match between Bobby Lashley and Simon Dean was rated a three out of 10, the lowest overall.

The event was released on DVD on November 8, 2005. The DVD reached a peak position of fourth on Billboard's DVD sales chart for recreational sports on December 3, 2005. It remained on the chart for four consecutive weeks, until December 24, when it ranked ninth.

Aftermath
The rivalry between Batista and Eddie Guerrero ended after Guerrero unexpectedly died due to heart failure on November 13, 2005. Their feud was planned to continue, as Guerrero would have gone back to his heroic character and won the World Heavyweight Championship.

The Undertaker would not be seen on-screen until Survivor Series after being burned inside a casket at the event. After being the sole survivor in his elimination match, Randy Orton celebrated his victory with his father, "Cowboy" Bob Orton, and wrestlers from the SmackDown! brand. During the celebration, druids brought out a casket and set it up in an upright position. Lightning then struck the casket and set it on fire. Undertaker emerged from the flaming casket and attacked the SmackDown wrestlers. The Ortons, however, escaped the attack. This set up a Hell in a Cell match between Randy and Undertaker at Armageddon. Undertaker defeated Randy and ended their storyline that had lasted nearly one year.

After successfully retaining the WWE United States Championship at the event, Chris Benoit started a  rivalry with Booker T. Booker defeated Benoit for the title on the edition of October 21 of SmackDown! to begin their feud. The following month, on the edition of November 24 of SmackDown!'', a match between Benoit and Booker for the title ended in a no-contest after both men's shoulders were on the mat while pinning one another. Theodore Long then vacated the title and announced that the two would face off against one another in a "Best of Seven series" for the title, in which the winner would be the man who won four matches over the other first. Booker defeated Benoit in the first match at Survivor Series, and eventually won the vacant title after Randy Orton, Booker's replacement due to a legitimate injury to his ankle at a house show, defeated Benoit in the seventh and final match in January. Booker began his fourth reign as United States Champion.

Results

References

External links
Official No Mercy 2005 website

Events in Houston
2005
2005 in Texas
Professional wrestling in Houston
2005 WWE pay-per-view events
WWE SmackDown